Mark Manson  (born March 9, 1984) is an American self-help author and blogger. As of 2022 he has authored or co-authored four books, three of which, The Subtle Art of Not Giving a Fuck, Everything Is Fucked: A Book About Hope, and Will, were The New York Times bestsellers.

Personal life
Mark Manson was raised in Austin, Texas, in the United States. He moved to Boston, Massachusetts to study, and graduated from Boston University in 2007.  

He is married to Fernanda Neute, a wellness influencer whom he met while traveling in São Paulo.  They currently live in New York City.

Blogs
Manson started his first blog about dating advice in 2008. 

In 2010, he started a new blog called post masculine (now defunct) which provided general life advice for men. Manson moved his blog to markmanson.net in 2013. 

In 2015, Manson published a blog article "The Subtle Art of Not Giving a Fuck", which would form the basis of his second book by the same name.

Publication history

Manson's first book, Models: Attract Women Through Honesty, was self-published in 2011. It was reissued by Pan Macmillan Australia in 2017.

His second book, The Subtle Art of Not Giving a Fuck: A Counterintuitive Approach to Living a Good Life, was published in 2016. It appeared on the New York Times Bestseller List at number six in the category of How-to and Miscellaneous in the week of October 2, 2016. and rose to number one on the list the week of July 16, 2017. As of May 2020, the book has spent 179 weeks in the top 10 and has sold over 12 million copies.

Manson's third book, Everything Is Fucked: A Book About Hope, was published by HarperCollins in 2019. It debuted at number one on the New York Times Bestseller List for Advice, How-to, and Miscellaneous.

In October 2018, Penguin Random House announced that Manson would work with Will Smith to write the actor's autobiography. It was published in November 2021.
 

In December 2020, Manson released a book in the form of audiobook called Love Is Not Enough exclusively through Audible.

Critical response

Erica Rivera, writing for Mandatory, describes Manson's style in the book as being "as blunt as a man-to-man chat", and Katharine Pushkar describes it as "foul-mouthed, funny-as-hell, [and] dead-on", and his philosophy thus: "that life is hard, you're not special, happiness is a hollow goal and therefore you should make sure you're focused on the truly worthwhile", in her review in the New York Daily News.

References

External links

 

1984 births
21st-century American non-fiction writers
American bloggers
American male bloggers
Boston University School of Management alumni
Living people
Writers from Austin, Texas